The 2015 Asian Women's Junior Handball Championship is the 13th edition of the Asian Women's Junior Handball Championship which took place from 6–14 August 2015 at Almaty, Kazakhstan. The tournament was held under the aegis of Asian Handball Federation. It also acts as the Asian qualifying tournament for the 2016 Women's Junior World Handball Championship.

Participating Teams

Results of Matches

Points table

Result of matches on 6th

Result of matches on 7th

Result of matches on 8th

Result of matches on 10th

Result of matches on 13th

Final standings

See also
 2015 Asian Women's Youth Handball Championship

External links
www.asianhandball.org

International handball competitions hosted by Kazakhstan
Asian Women's Junior Handball Championship, 2015
Asia
Asian Handball Championships